Expect the Unexpected is a 1998 Hong Kong action film directed by Patrick Yau and starring Lau Ching-wan and Simon Yam.

Cast and roles
 Simon Yam as Ken
 Lau Ching-wan as Sam
 Yoyo Mung as Mandy
 Ruby Wong as Macy
 Lam Suet as Collins
 Lester Chan as Head of Security Carrier Robbers
 Joe Cheng as Heavy-armed Robber in Apartment
 Hui Shiu-hung as Ben
 Park Ka-sin as Isabella
 Keiji Sato as Jewelry Shop Robber
 Raymond Wong Ho-yin as Jimmy

References

External links
 
 Hong Kong Cinemagic entry

1998 films
1990s crime action films
Hong Kong crime action films
Police detective films
Milkyway Image films
1990s Cantonese-language films
Films set in Hong Kong
Films shot in Hong Kong
1990s Hong Kong films